David John Charles Sears (born 9 December 1955) is a former professional racing driver and son of touring car legend Jack Sears.

Biography
The Sears dynasty has been involved in motor racing for nearly 100 years and four generations. David won two British Formula Ford Championships in 1979 and then raced in Formula 3 against Nigel Mansell and Stefan Johansson with much success. Sears was asked to test for Lotus in Formula One but ultimately Nigel Mansell got the drive and Sears switched to racing touring cars for Ford, Toyota and Jaguar in the European Touring Car Championship. He then raced for Toyota in Japan in Group C and Pontiac in the USA. In 1989 Sears raced for Aston Martin in the World Sports Car Championship and Le Mans. In 1990 Sears finished third at Le Mans in a Porsche 962 with Tiff Needell and Anthony Reid.

Sears had started his own racing team in 1987 and in 1992 he stopped racing to concentrate on his racing team and other business activities. His racing teams under David Sears Motorsport and Super Nova have won 16 Championships in 26 years and produced more than 20 Formula One drivers, including Jan Magnussen, Taki Inoue, Ricardo Zonta, Juan Pablo Montoya, Mark Webber and Sebastian Bourdais. Sears has also managed several of these drivers.

Sears is the great-grandson of John Sears who founded Sears Holdings, the boot and shoe empire in Northampton. John Sears was the first person to establish chain shops throughout Great Britain. He died aged 46 owning two shoe factories and over 900 freehold shops. With no tax planning and tax at 98% the family lost the business to Charles Clore in one of the biggest corporate takeovers at the time. The remnants of that empire and some of the best prime retail sites in Great Britain are now owned by Philip Green and his company Arcadia for Topshop and BHS.

David Sears may have inherited some business acumen from his ancestors and helped Nova Group in Japan develop their language school business to be placed on the Tokyo Stock Exchange. In fact they were business partners for 14 years with the Super Nova Racing Team.

Sears has also been involved as a director of Thunderball, a mining company in West Africa and more recently has helped Dr. Doug Linman create the MQ Corporation in the US and UK to launch Solar Liquid Power as a new form of green energy.

Racing record

Complete British Saloon / Touring Car Championship results 
(key) Races in bold indicate pole position. Races in italics indicate fastest lap (1 point awarded – 1987–1989 in class)

‡ Endurance driver

† Not eligible for points.

Complete World Touring Car Championship results
(key) (Races in bold indicate pole position) (Races in italics indicate fastest lap)

24 Hours of Le Mans results

References

Living people
1955 births
24 Hours of Le Mans drivers
British Touring Car Championship drivers
World Sportscar Championship drivers
A1 Grand Prix people
Australian Endurance Championship drivers
Ecurie Ecosse drivers